Guadalupe Rivera Saavedra, better known by the stage name Lupillo Rivera, is an American singer and songwriter. In 2010, Rivera was awarded a Grammy Award for his album, Tu Esclavo y Amo. His older sister was the late singer and actress Jenni Rivera. In 2019, he was one of the coaches for the first season of the Mexican singing competition show, La Voz on TV Azteca after being acquired from Televisa after 7 seasons.

Early life
Rivera was born in Long Beach, California to Rosa Saavedra and Pedro Rivera. Prior to Lupillo being born, Pedro Jr., Gustavo, his mother and his father moved to Long Beach, California, where Lupillo graduated from Long Beach Polytechnic High School in 1990.

Career

Rivera initially wanted to be a restaurateur. However, his father, Pedro Rivera, was a recording label/studio owner (Cintas Acuario). Wanting to give his son a hands-on business experience, Rivera hired his son Lupillo to work at the studio when a contracted singer failed to show up for a recording session.

Lupillo was given the task of looking for local talent at bars, with the idea that some of that talent could be signed by his father's company. When Lupillo first started singing he was called "El Torito" Lupillo Rivera. Later when becoming more famous he was known as "El Toro del Corrido". His uncle was a semi-famous professional boxer, known as El Toro Rivera to Mexican boxing fans. By 1999, Lupillo began to sing using his own name [Lupillo]. By then, he had already signed with Sony Discos. His star began to rise meteorically at that point. In 2001, he was awarded a Premios lo Nuestro.

By 2010, nearly a decade into his career, Rivera had received various Grammy and Latin Grammy nominations for his work, that same year, he was awarded a Grammy Award for his album, Tu Esclavo y Amo.

Discography

 1995 – Selena, La Estrella
 1999 – El Moreno
 1999 – Puros Corridos Macizos
 2000 – El Toro de Corridos
 2001 – El Señor de los Cielos
 2001 – Y Sigue La Vendimia
 2001 – Cartel de Tijuana
 2001 – Veinte Mujeres
 2001 – Despreciado
 2001 – Sufriendo a Solas
 2002 – Amorcito Corazón
 2002 – Los Hermanos Más Buscados
 2003 – De Bohemia con Lupillo Rivera
 2004 – Con Mis Propias Manos
 2004 – Pa' Corridos
 2005 – El Rey de Las Cantinas
 2006 – Entre Copas y Botellas
 2007 – Mi Homenaje a Pedro Infante
 2007 – Desde Una Fiesta Privada
 2008 – En Acústico
 2008 – El Tiro de Gracia
 2009 – Tu Esclavo y Amo
 2010 – 24 Horas

Awards and nominations

Grammy Awards
The Grammy Awards are awarded annually by the National Academy of Recording Arts & Sciences in the United States. Rivera has received one award from three nominations.

|-
| 2008
| Entre Copas y Botellas
|rowspan=3 scope="row"| Best Banda Album
| 
|-
| 2009
| El Tiro de Gracia
| 
|-
| 2010
| Tu Esclavo y Amo
| 
|-

Latin Grammy Awards
The Latin Grammy Awards are awarded annually by the Latin Academy of Recording Arts & Sciences in the United States. Rivera has received three nominations.

|-
| 2004
| Live! en Concierto – Universal Amphitheatre
|rowspan=2 scope="row"| Best Banda Album
| 
|-
| 2005
| Con Mis Propias Manos
| 
|-
| 2006
| El Rey de las Cantinas
| Best Ranchero/Mariachi Album
|

Lo Nuestro Awards
The Lo Nuestro Awards are awarded annually by the Spanish-language television network Univision in the United States. Rivera has received three awards from seven nominations.

|-
|rowspan=4 scope="row"| 2002
|rowspan=2 scope="row"| Lupillo Rivera
| Regional Mexican Male Artist of the Year
| 
|-
| Banda Artist of the Year
| 
|-
| Despreciado
| Regional Mexican Album of the Year
| 
|-
| "Despreciado"
| Regional Mexican Song of the Year
| 
|-
|rowspan=3 scope="row"| 2003
|rowspan=2 scope="row"| Lupillo Rivera
| Regional Mexican Male Artist of the Year
| 
|-
| Banda Artist of the Year
| 
|-
| Amorcito Corazón
| Regional Mexican Album of the Year
|

References

Living people
American banda musicians
Grammy Award winners
Musicians from Jalisco
American musicians of Mexican descent
Mexican emigrants to the United States
Universal Music Latin Entertainment artists
Musicians from Long Beach, California
Hispanic and Latino American musicians
1972 births
Long Beach Polytechnic High School alumni